Hyun Jung-hwa (born October 6, 1969 in Busan, South Korea) is a retired table tennis player from South Korea who competed in the 1988 Summer Olympics, and in the 1992 Summer Olympics.

Career
National South Korean table tennis player Hyun Jung-Hwa brought about the golden age of table tennis to Korea. She is one of an elite group of players who have won at least one gold medal in every discipline they were eligible to compete in at the World Table Tennis Championships. Her first gold medal came in the women's doubles (partnering Yang Young-Ja) at the 1987 World Table Tennis Championships in New Delhi. She followed it up by winning the mixed doubles title with Yoo Nam-Kyu at the 1989 World Table Tennis Championships in Dortmund. During 1988 Seoul Olympics, she led the South Korean team to victory against the unbeatable Chinese team. She was again part of the first ever Unified Korean team that stunned China to win the women's team event at the 1991 World Table Tennis Championships in Chiba. Her final World title was an unexpected win in the women's singles event at the 1993 World Table Tennis Championships in Gothenburg, where she also brought home medals in the mixed doubles and team event, making her the only Korean to achieve a Grand Slam. In 2011, she became the first Korean table tennis player to be inducted into the International Table Tennis Federation's Hall of Fame.

Notable achievements
Hall of Fame Inductee, International Table Tennis Federation
Executive Director, Korea Table Tennis Association
Table Tennis Director, Korean Racing Authority
Head Coach, South Korean national team

In popular culture

Film
The story of the Unified Korean team in the 1991 World Championships and its victory over the Chinese in the women's team event is told by the movie As One starring actress Ha Ji-won as Hyun Jung-Hwa.

Television appearances
2020: King of Mask Singer (MBC), contestant as "Libra" (episode 251)
2021: Hospital Playlist Season 2 (tvN), cameo. Yulje hospital hosts a departmental table tennis tournament every year. Hyun appears as one of the Department of Nuclear Medicine doctors, and easily wins the championship. (episode 9)
2022: National University is National University (MBN, 2022); Participant

See also
 List of table tennis players

References

1969 births
Living people
South Korean female table tennis players
Table tennis players at the 1988 Summer Olympics
Table tennis players at the 1992 Summer Olympics
Olympic table tennis players of South Korea
Olympic gold medalists for South Korea
Olympic bronze medalists for South Korea
Olympic medalists in table tennis
Asian Games medalists in table tennis
Table tennis players at the 1986 Asian Games
Table tennis players at the 1990 Asian Games
Medalists at the 1986 Asian Games
Medalists at the 1990 Asian Games
Asian Games gold medalists for South Korea
Asian Games silver medalists for South Korea
Asian Games bronze medalists for South Korea
Sportspeople from Busan
Medalists at the 1988 Summer Olympics
Medalists at the 1992 Summer Olympics
20th-century South Korean women